Heartfelt may refer to:
 The Heartfelt, a 2001 album by Figurine
 Heartfelt (Fourplay album) (2002)
 Heartfelt (Kyla album) (2007)
 "Heartfelt", an episode of The Good Doctor